Aframomum elliottii is a species in the ginger family, Zingiberaceae.  It was first described by John Gilbert Baker and renamed by Karl Moritz Schumann.

References 

elliottii